An American Tail: The Treasure of Manhattan Island (also known as An American Tail 3: The Treasure of Manhattan Island) is a 1998 American animated adventure film produced by Universal Cartoon Studios and directed by Larry Latham. It is the third film in the An American Tail series, the first to be released direct-to-video, and the first in the series to use digital ink and paint.

While retaining Dom DeLuise throughout the film series, the film reunites the voice cast of Nehemiah Persoff and Erica Yohn from both An American Tail (1986) and An American Tail: Fievel Goes West, Pat Musick from An American Tail with the return of her character Tony Toponi, and introduces Elaine Bilstad, René Auberjonois, David Carradine, John Kassir, Ron Perlman, Tony Jay and Richard Karron. Fievel and Tanya Mousekewitz's voices were performed by Thomas Dekker and Lacey Chabert, replacing the previous voice actors Phillip Glasser, Amy Green from the 1986 film, and Cathy Cavadini from both Fievel Goes West and the TV series Fievel's American Tails.

The film premiered in the United Kingdom on November 16, 1998, and was released in the United States and Canada on February 15, 2000. This was Erica Yohn and Elaine Bilstad's final film appearances.

Plot
The story begins as it returns to New York City sometime after the events of the first and before the second movie, as Fievel and Tony discover that an ancient treasure lies underneath Manhattan when snooping around an abandoned subway (the Beach Pneumatic Transit system) and stumbling upon the remains of a dead mouse clutching a treasure map, deciding they must find it with the help of an archaeologist Tony knows: Dr. Dithering, along with fighting five villains as well.

The movie focuses on the relationship between the over-exploited workers of a sweatshop (in this case, a cheese production line) and the factory's robber baron owners: Mr. Grasping (Ron Perlman), Mr. Toplofty (Tony Jay) and Mr. O'Bloat (Richard Karron). The treasure under Manhattan turns out to be a group of Lenape mice living a long-distance beneath the surface (far below the sewers) that decided to hide when they saw how the first Europeans only brought war and disease with them and didn't want to wait for the European mice to do the same to them. 

The sachem, Chief Wulisso (David Carradine), decides to send his daughter Cholena (Elaine Bilstad), to the surface to see if they have "changed their ways." Upon their return, Scuttlebutt (John Kassir) (one of the members of the expedition to find the treasure) reports to the villains unbeknownst to the rest of the members of the expedition, who then decide to use this to their advantage. They lie to all the workers of the sweatshop about Cholena (obviously not by name), telling them that she is their enemy. The corrupt mouse police chief, McBrusque (Sherman Howard), and Scuttlebutt scavenge every nook and cranny until they find her. After the angry mouse mob try to capture Cholena and anyone else involved with her, Fievel and his friends decide to take Cholena back underground before being put in further harm's way, but the police find out and go after them.

Meanwhile, everyone finds out about Dr. Dithering's friendship with the Indian and take him to the butcher shop for his execution. Papa tells everyone about how madness like this is why they all left for America and should work together to become friends with those different from them as the fellow Americans they are. Tiger the orange tabby cat saves Dr. Dithering from the villains, who escape and order McBrusque and his men to find and kill the Lenape mice.

Upon returning Cholena to her home, they tell the chief what is happening. McBrusque, Scuttlebutt, and the other police officers show up to the village, but the Chief, the Native Americans, Fievel and his friends drive the villains away. The chief gives them a gunpowder bomb to collapse the tunnel connecting the Native Americans to the outside world. But before they can do so, they are ambushed by the enraged McBrusque and Scuttlebutt who attempt to get revenge on the Mousekewitz children and Tony once and for all, but the two crooks are overpowered and Fievel manages to set off the bomb. This floods the tunnel, together with McBrusque and Scuttlebutt as they fall into the chasm to their deaths. Tony and Tanya managed to reach higher ground, but Fievel is seemingly carried off by the current.

When the water recedes Tanya and Tony desperately search through the mud to find him, before giving up. But just then, Fievel breaks through the surface, and all three share a muddy group hug, thankful that everyone survived.

The movie ends with Fievel's papa forming a worker's union and the villains agreeing amongst themselves that they're forced to negotiate with "that riff-raff" to avoid a strike. Meanwhile, Tiger is enjoying his new job as the police chief. The last scene is Fievel seeing, through a foldable telescope, Cholena and her father disappearing into a hidden door at the foot of a statue, which pleases Fievel (as he wishes for the best for them).

Voice cast 

 Thomas Dekker as Fievel Mousekewitz
 Lacey Chabert as Tanya Mousekewitz
 Nehemiah Persoff as Papa Mousekewitz
 Erica Yohn as Mama Mousekewitz
 Dom DeLuise as Tiger
 Pat Musick as Tony Toponi
 Elaine Bilstad as Cholena
 Leeza Miller as Cholena's singing voice
 René Auberjonois as Dr. Dithering
 David Carradine as Chief Wulisso
 Ron Perlman as Mr. Grasping
 Tony Jay as Mr. Toplofty
 Richard Karron as Mr. O'Bloat
 Sherman Howard as Police Chief McBrusque
 John Kassir as Scuttlebutt
 Dave Mallow as additional voices

The Treasure of Manhattan Island is the final film Bilstad contributed to as it would be released posthumously in the United States.

Production
Following a six year hiatus for the An American Tail series, Universal kicked off a $15 million marketing campaign to reignite interest in the franchise with re-releases of the first two films leading up to the release of An American Tail III with the fourth installment scheduled for the following June. The mandate for the series as dictated by then President of Universal Worldwide Home Entertainment, Louis Feola, was "...to create the same value and success for An American Tail as the studio did with the Land Before Time".

Animation
Japanese studio TMS-Kyokuichi Corporation was the overseas animation studio for the film.

Casting
New voices were handed out for Fievel and Tanya during production while some of the original characters retaining their original voices from the first film. Phillip Glasser was unable to recast as Fievel for this film due to voice changing by age, as Glasser was 19 at the time. Universal hired then-child actor Thomas Dekker as Fievel. Then-15-year-old Lacey Chabert was chosen as the voice for Tanya. The previous actress, Cathy Cavadini, could not participate in the role at the time due to being under the contract for Cartoon Network while casting for Blossom in The Powerpuff Girls. Pat Musick returned to reprise her role as Tony, as the character returns since An American Tail in 1986.

Universal hired actors from the previous works to voice the characters that were made exclusively for this movie. René Auberjonois (Odo in Star Trek: Deep Space Nine), David Carradine (Kwai Chang Caine in Kung Fu), Ron Perlman (Vincent in Beauty and the Beast), and John Kassir (the Crypt-Keeper from the Tales from the Crypt franchise) are cast as Dr. Dithering, Chief Wulisso, Mr. Grasping, and Scuttlebutt, respectively.

Elaine Bilstad, a Native American actress, was chosen to voice for Cholena. Bilstad was previously given limited roles as one-time characters in Walker, Texas Ranger, Baywatch Nights, and as Catherine in the TV movie The Broken Chain. She even played White Snow, the indigenous version of Snow White in Happily Ever After: Fairy Tales for Every Child. This was Bilstad’s final role before she died of a heart problem on January 30, 1999, releasing the film posthumously in the United States. Her character became absent in the next film.

Technical issues
Despite restoring the continuity from the first film as mandated, most of the original film’s characters are written off from subsequent sequels due to casting issues or that by absences of the original actors, except returning Tony after being excluded from the Green River continuity without Musick’s input in the early 1990s. Madeline Kahn did not return to reprise her role for Gussie Mausheimer nor returning her character in the films as she was busy casting for other films, such as A Bug's Life and Judy Berlin, before being diagnosed with cancer in late 1998. Bridget, Tony’s soulmate from the first film, remains absent in the later sequels in question as her actress, Cathianne Blore, was since battling cancer in the mid 1990s, discarding the importance to the franchise’s continuity. Her last work was Quest for Glory: Shadows of Darkness in 1994. Christopher Plummer did not return to reprise his role for Henri as he was busy casting for other films, such as The First Christmas and The Clown at Midnight. His character is only seen as a background cameo.

Songs
In addition to three original songs, archive music from the first two films are reused.

Release 

As early as March 17, 1998, The Treasure of Manhattan Island was advertised on the VHS release of The Chipmunk Adventure. It was then advertised on the VHS reissues of An American Tail and its sequel Fievel Goes West on August 11, 1998. However, the film’s North American release date remained undisclosed until late December 1999, receiving the VHS release on February 15, 2000. It was later released on DVD on January 20, 2004, with a sing-along version of "Anywhere In Your Dreams" as a bonus feature. It was later combined in a DVD set packaged with three other movies on June 13, 2017.

Overseas
This prequel premiered in the United Kingdom in November 1998. It was also released on April 6, 2001 in Italy, January 2, 2003 in Spain, February 9, 2003 in Australia, April 3, 2003 in Russia, June 19, 2003 in France, November 4, 2003 in Germany and April 4, 2006 in Japan.

Reception 
Robert Pardi of TV Guide gave the film 2 out of 5 stars and wrote: "Although the bright and bubbly animation lacks depth, these cute little vermin have just enough personality to make tykes unaware they're being spoonfed ethnic-harmony aphorisms". Susan King of the Los Angeles Times wrote that young children under 10-years-old might find it entertaining. Grace Montgomery of Common Sense Media felt that the politically sensitive elements depicted in the film are "out of place for An American Tail" and recommended that "your kids would be better off to stick with the original An American Tail and skip this one".

References

External links 
 

1998 animated films
1998 direct-to-video films
1990s adventure films
Direct-to-video sequel films
Universal Animation Studios animated films
Films set in the 1880s
Animated films about mice
Direct-to-video interquel films
Direct-to-video prequel films
American children's animated films
Universal Pictures direct-to-video animated films
Films about Native Americans
Films about prejudice
Animated films set in Manhattan
Animated films about cats
Rail transport films
Films scored by Michael Tavera
1990s American animated films
An American Tail (franchise)
Universal Pictures direct-to-video films
1990s children's animated films
1990s English-language films
American adventure films
American direct-to-video films
American prequel films